HIP 5158 b is an extrasolar planet which orbits the K-type main sequence star HIP 5158, located approximately 130 light years away in the constellation Cetus. This planet was detected by HARPS on October 19, 2009, together with 29 other planets.

References

20091019
Exoplanets detected by radial velocity
Giant planets
Cetus (constellation)